The Belarusian national bandy team has been competing in the annual Bandy World Championship since 2001 (it started to be an annual tournament from 2003), but not in 2010, 2018 and 2019. The plan was to participate also in 2018, but Federation of International Bandy seemingly was not interested in letting Belarus play.  In 2004, Belarus defeated Canada to win the Group B championship. Belarus played in Group A in 2006, 2007 and again in 2008 after winning 9-1 against USA team, best team of Group B. 

The participation in the rink bandy tournament of the first CIS festival for national sports and games in 2017, Фестиваль национальных видов спорта и игр государств — участников Содружества Независимых Государств, resulted in fourth place.

The national team is supervised by the Belarusian Bandy Federation, a member of the Federation of International Bandy.

Squads

2015 WCS
Belarusian squad at the 2015 World Championship in Khabarovsk, Russia.

References

External links
Team picture

National bandy teams
Bandy
Bandy in Belarus